Dilman Dila is a Ugandan writer, film maker and a social activist. He is the author of a collection of short stories, A Killing in the Sun, and of two novellas, Cranes Crest at Sunset, and The Terminal Move. He was shortlisted for the 2013 Commonwealth Short Story Prize for "A Killing in the Sun", longlisted for the Short Story Day Africa prize, 2013, and nominated for the 2008 Million Writers Awards for the short story "Homecoming". He was longlisted for the BBC International Radio Playwriting Competition with his first radio play, Toilets are for Something Fishy. His film The Felistas Fable (2013) won four awards at the Uganda Film Festival 2014, for Best Screenplay, Best Actor, Best Feature Film, and Film of the Year (Best Director). It won two nominations at the Africa Movie Academy Awards for Best First Feature by a Director, and Best Make-up Artist. It was also nominated for the African Magic Viewers Choice Awards for Best Make-up artist, 2013. His first short film, What Happened in Room 13, is one of the most watched African films on YouTube. In 2015, he was longlisted for the Inaugural Jalada Prize for Literature for his story "Onen and his Daughter".

Early life and education
Dilman was born in Tororo, Uganda, on 31 December 1977. He grew up with his family on Bazaar Street, which harboured a multitude of cultures and nationalities. It is exposure at an early childhood to different stories from different tribes that gave him a strong foundation in storytelling. He attained primary education at Rock View Primary School, and secondary education at St. Peter's College, Tororo, before proceeding to Makerere University, where he did a BA in Social Sciences, majoring in Political Science (International Relations) and Economics.

Upon completing his university degree, he worked for human rights organisations, and for non-government developmental agencies for eight years, an experience that not only made him a social activist, but provided him with material for his writing and filmmaking.

Writing
He was introduced into storytelling at an early age by the folktales that he used to hear from his parents, and from fellow children, in the town he grew up in, Tororo. He started writing when he was 15 years old. His first works appeared in print in The Sunday Vision in 2001, and have since featured in several e-zines and book anthologies. These include The African Roar anthology in 2013, Storymoja, and Gowanus Books.

He writes speculative fiction, especially in the genres of horror, science fiction, and fantasy. The story that won a shortlist with the Commonwealth Short Story Prize, "A Killing in the Sun", is a ghost tale. He published his first science fiction story, Lights on Water, in The Short Anthology. In 2014, he launched his first collection of speculative short stories, during the Storymoja Festival, in Nairobi, Kenya.

In 2013, he was shortlisted for the prestigious Commonwealth Short Story Prize and longlisted for the Short Story Day Africa Prize.

In 2013, he facilitated a short-story surgery workshop, together with Alexander Ikawah, in collaboration with Commonwealth Writers, at the Storymoja Hay Festival. and in 2014 he was a mentor in the Writivism project. He returned to the Storymoja Festival, where he was a festival guest in 2014, conducting a masterclass with Prajwal Parajuly.

In 2013, the San Diego State University included his short story "Homecoming", in its syllabus for an English course.

Film making
Dilman Dila is a self-taught film maker. He however greatly benefited from the Maisha Film Lab, where he learned the craft from experienced mentors from Indian Cinema, and from Hollywood. He attended five different labs with Maisha, spanning a period from 2006 until 2008, in the areas of screenwriting and directing, for both fiction and documentary. The other trainings he attained include the Durban Talent Campus 2008, MNet Screenwriters Workshop in 2009, European Social Documentary International in 2012, and Berlinale Talents in 2014.

Many regard his first short film, What Happened in Room 13 (2007), featuring the famous comedians Ugandan Richard Tuwangye, Anne Kansiime, Veronica Namanda, Hanningtong Bujingo, and Gerald Rutaro, as a masterpiece from Uganda's young industry. The Young Ones Who Won't Stay Behind (2008) was his first collaboration with the world-famous film maker Mira Nair. Dila spent two years in Nepal, after receiving funding from Voluntary Service Overseas (VSO), to work with local organisations on film making for social change. While there, he made several documentaries. Untouchable Love (2011) was selected for IDFA's Docs for Sale, 2011, where it picked a UK-based distributor. With The Sound of One Leg Dancing (2011), he won The Jury Award at the Nepal International Indigenous Film Festival in 2012. The Dancing Poet (2012) made its debut at the We Speak, Here online festival in 2014. The two years in Nepal helped him to hone his craft, before he felt that the next stories he wanted to package and send out into the world were explicitly African in makeup, even if they came from a shared perspective that informed his earlier work.

His first narrative feature, The Felistas Fable (2013) won two nominations at the Africa Movie Academy Awards for Best First Feature by a Director, and for Best Make-up Artist It was also nominated for the African Magic Viewers Choice Awards 2014 for Best Make-up Artist.

Published works

Books

Short story collections

Short stories
"Yad Madit" in Africanfuturism: An Anthology, (2020, Brittle Paper)
"Red_Bati" in Dominion: An Anthology of Speculative Fiction From Africa and the African Diaspora, 2020
"Onen and his Daughter" in Jalada, 2015
"Lights on Water", in The Short Anthology, 2014
"The Puppets of Maramudhu", in 
"The Broken Pot", in 
"Billy is Three Weeks Dead", in 
"Stones Bounce on Water", Storymoja.com, April 2011
"The Young Matchmaker" in The Kathmandu Post, 4 July 2010 
"In Search of a Smoke", Gowanus Books, 2007
"Homecoming", Gowanus Books, 2007, and nominated for the 2008 Million Writers Award: Notable Online Fiction of 2007
"Fragments of Canvas", in Dark Fire, January 2005
"Lights on Water", in The Short Story anthology, 2014
"Bloodline of Blades", in ShadowSword, October 2005
"Stu's Honeymoon", in The Swamp, 2004
"Death in the Moonlight", in The Sunday Vision, May 2001
"The Campaign Agent", in The Sunday Vision, May 2001
"The Soldier's Wife", in The Sunday Vision, February 2001
"The First War", in The Sunday Vision, January 2001

Filmography

Producer/Director/Writer
Saving Mugisha (2013, Uganda), 18 minutes, fiction
The Felistas Fable (2013, Uganda), 90 minutes, fiction
The Dancing Poet (2012, Nepal/Uganda), 60 minutes, documentary
The Sound of One Leg Dancing (2011, Nepal), 30 minutes, documentary 
Untouchable Love (2011, Nepal), 90 minutes, documentary 
Street Strings (2008, Uganda), 15 minutes, documentary
Listening to Her Voice (2008, Uganda), 12 minutes, film 
Home is a Fine Place to Die (2007, Uganda), 3 minutes, film 
Under Sarah's Bed (2007, Uganda), 1 minute, film

Writer/Director
What Happened in Room 13 (2007, Uganda), 18 minutes, film
The Young Ones Who Won't Stay Behind (2008, Uganda), 15 minutes, documentary 
How Will I Get a Drink? (2007, Uganda), 5 minutes, documentary

Writer
After the Silence (2006, Uganda), 34 minutes, film

Awards and recognition

Writing
Longlisted for BBC International Radio Playwriting Competition 2014
Shortlisted Commonwealth Short Story Prize 2013
Longlisted for the Short Story Day Africa prize, 2013
Nominated for the 2008 Million Writers Awards: Notable online fiction.

Film
Winner of Film of the Year (Best Director) at the Uganda Film Festival 2014 for The Felistas Fable
Winner of Best Feature Film at the Uganda Film Festival 2014 for The Felistas Fable
Winner of Best Screenplay at the Uganda Film Festival 2014 for The Felistas Fable
Nominated for Best First Feature by a Director at the Africa Movie Academy Awards 2014, for the film The Felistas Fable
Winner of The Jury Award (Bronze drum) at the Nepal International Indigenous Film Festival, with The Sound of One Leg Dancing, 2012
His film, The Felistas Fable, was nominated for Best Make-up Artist at the Africa Movie Academy Awards 2014 and at the African Magic Views Choice Awards, 2014

References

External links 
"Where’s the African Chick-Lit?"
"Kwani? at Storymoja Hay Festival – Panel Discussion : Reservoir of Public Memory & Kwani? Sunday Salon"
"Biographies and Credits "
"Now I Write Humorous And Light Stories"
"After the Silence Cast and Crew "
"Festivalfonden stöder haitisk filmskola"
"The First Issue Of The Short Anthology Uses Joe Coleman’s Photographs As The Basis For A Series Of Short Stories"
"Africa: Maisha film lab accepting applications for 2008 labs"
"Mentors"
"This Has Been a Good Year"

Living people
1977 births
People from Tororo District
Makerere University alumni
Ugandan male short story writers
Ugandan short story writers
Ugandan novelists
Male novelists
Ugandan male writers
Ugandan dramatists and playwrights
Ugandan film directors
Ugandan screenwriters
Ugandan writers
Maisha Film Lab alumni
21st-century short story writers
21st-century male writers
21st-century screenwriters